The 1920 Northwestern Purple team represented Northwestern University during the 1920 college football season. In their first year under head coach Elmer McDevitt, the Purple compiled a 3–4 record (2–3 against Big Ten Conference opponents) and finished in seventh place in the Big Ten Conference.

Schedule

References

Northwestern
Northwestern Wildcats football seasons
Northwestern Purple football